Leonard T. Grant (January 17, 1906 – August 6, 1938) was a professional American football offensive tackle in the National Football League for the New York Giants when they won the NFL championship in 1934.  He was born in Boston, Massachusetts.

See also
History of the New York Giants (1925-1978)

References

Career statistics
Len Grant's profile at NFL.com
Biography in Dictionary of New York Sports

Players of American football from Boston
American football offensive tackles
New York University alumni
New York Giants players
1906 births
1938 deaths
Sportspeople from Dedham, Massachusetts